Shamrock Warriors RFC was a Rugby sevens club founded in 2009 by former Leinster out-half Fergal Campion. They were the only 7's club in Ireland endorsed by the Irish Rugby Football Union and were established to represent Ireland as the only official Irish 7's team competing at the top level tournaments in Europe.

Aims
The clubs aim was to develop a pool of experienced 7's players for the IRFU to be in position to select to develop into a future international 7's squad to compete in tournaments by giving them experience playing in the top level competition should the IRFU become involved in professional international sevens or in the Olympic Sevens. The intention was to develop the game in Ireland and use the IRFU approved Warriors as the foundation for a national side. Ireland does not participate in the official HSBC Sevens World Series. The Shamrock Warriors was the beginning of the process of getting sevens into the IRFU and into the national circuit. The team was self-funded.

Players
The player pool consisted of players who are playing club rugby in Ireland, those coming from provincial contracts and development players that may not win full professional contracts.

Women's team
There is also a women's team that consists of club players around the country led by former Irish captain Sarah Jane Belton and is managed by Kazakhstan international Luke O'Callaghan.  The team also hopes to recruit female Gaelic football players.

Key staff
Former Leinster and Scotland coach Matt Williams has been secured as a technical advisor for the venture while a committee including former internationals Denis Hickie and Malcolm O'Kelly has also come on board to assist the project.

The club aims to recruit players on playing at club level or those who may be coming off a professional contract, those falling off academy contracts as well as potential players coming up from school level.  The team is managed by Derek Thornton.

Committee
Fergal Campion
Derek Thornton
Matt Williams
David McHugh
Denis Hickie
Victor Costello
Malcolm O'Kelly

Competitions
The club is planning to compete in a number of outings for 2011 including:
Kinsale Sevens
Omagh
Manchester
London Rocks
West Country
Newquay
Roma seven

References

Irish rugby union teams
Rugby clubs established in 2009
2009 establishments in Ireland
Rugby sevens in Ireland
Ireland national rugby sevens team